Kloot may refer to:
I Am Kloot, band
the ball used in the game Klootschieten

See also
Klute (disambiguation)